Samarsky City District is a district (raion) of the city of Samara, Samara Oblast, Russia. Population:

References

City districts of Samara